Picea martinezii, the Martinez spruce, is a medium-sized evergreen tree growing to 25–35 m tall, and with a trunk diameter of up to 1 m. It is native to northeast Mexico, where it occurs at two localities in the Sierra Madre Oriental mountains in Nuevo León. It grows at moderate altitudes from 2150–2600 m, growing along streamsides in mountain valleys, where moisture levels in the soil are greater than the otherwise low rainfall in the area would suggest.

The bark is thin and scaly, flaking off in small circular plates 5–10 cm across. The crown is conic, with widely spaced branches with drooping branchlets. The shoots are stout, pale buff-brown, glabrous, and with prominent pulvini. The leaves are needle-like, 23–35 mm long, stout, moderately flattened in cross-section, bright glossy green with inconspicuous lines of stomata; the tip is viciously sharp.

The cones are pendulous, broad cylindrical, 8–16 cm long and 3 cm broad when closed, opening to 6 cm broad. They have stiff, smoothly rounded scales 2-2.5 cm broad, and are green, maturing pale brown 6–8 months after pollination. The seeds are black, 4 mm long, with a 12–16 mm long pale brown wing.

Martinez spruce was only discovered in 1981, and is critically endangered with just two small populations, comprising a few hundred trees and a dozen trees respectively. Fossil evidence shows it had a wider distribution in the past, south to central Mexico. It is related to Chihuahua spruce from northwest Mexico, but differs in the longer, green leaves, and the larger, broader cones with larger scales. No other related spruces are found in North America, with its next-closest relatives in eastern Asia.

It is a very attractive tree and is starting to be planted as an ornamental tree in botanical gardens, particularly valued in warm areas as it is one of the most heat-tolerant of all spruces. It is named after the Mexican botanist Maximino Martínez.

References

External links

Gymnosperm Database
Photo of tree

martinezii
Trees of Nuevo León
Critically endangered plants
Flora of the Sierra Madre Oriental